This is a list of electoral results for the electoral district of Cunningham in Queensland state elections.

Members for Cunningham

Election results

Elections in the 2000s
Results in the 2006 election were:

Elections in the 1990s

Elections in the 1980s 

The two party preferred vote was not counted between the National and Liberal candidates for Cunningham.

Elections in the 1970s 

The two candidate preferred vote was not counted between the National and Liberal candidates for Cunningham.

Elections in the 1960s

Elections in the 1950s

Elections in the 1940s

Elections in the 1930s

Elections in the 1920s

Elections in the 1910s

References

Queensland state electoral results by district